Highlands station is one of three commuter railroad stations along Metra's BNSF Line in Hinsdale, Illinois. As of 2018, Highlands is the 163rd busiest of Metra's 236 non-downtown stations, with an average of 202 weekday boardings. While Metra give the address as "1/4 mile north of the Intersection of County Line Road & 47th Street," it is actually opposite the corner of County Line Road and Highland Road. Parking is available at the station, as well as across the tracks on the south side of Hillgrove Avenue between Oak Street and County Line Road.

The station is a small stone-faced structure used only during rush hour and is near Hinsdale Hospital, and three local parks, Highland Park, Veeck Park, and Pierce Park. There are no connections to buses at this stop.

References

External links

Quaint image of Highlands Station (BNSF Railway Images)
Station from Oak Street from Google Maps Street View

Metra stations in Illinois
Former Chicago, Burlington and Quincy Railroad stations
Hinsdale, Illinois
Railway stations in the United States opened in 1880
Railway stations in Cook County, Illinois
Railway stations in DuPage County, Illinois